= Telford United =

Telford United may refer to one of two English football clubs based in Telford, Shropshire:

- Telford United F.C., 1872–2004
- AFC Telford United, from 2004
